Emma Alyce Entzminger (born January 11, 1996) is a Canadian softball infielder with the Canada women's national softball team. Entzminger played college softball at San Jose State University in the U.S. First named to the Canada national team in 2015, Entzminger competed with the team at the 2015 Pan American Games and later the 2018 Women's Softball World Championship. Entzminger went on to win two international medals with Canada, first silver in the softball at the 2019 Pan American Games then bronze in the 2020 Summer Olympics.

Early life and education

Entzminger was born in Victoria, British Columbia and graduated from Lambrick Park Secondary School in Victoria in 2014. At Lambrick Park, Entzminger played five sports: basketball, soccer, softball, tennis, and volleyball.
After secondary school, Entzminger attended San Jose State University in the U.S. city of San Jose, California and played on the San Jose State Spartans softball team from 2015 to 2018. In four seasons, Entzminger played 206 games, primarily starting at third base in 2016 and 2017 and shortstop in 2018. Entzminger batted a career best .324 in 2016 and .269 as a senior in 2018. Entzminger graduated from San Jose State in 2018 with a bachelor's degree in kinesiology with an emphasis in exercise and rehab science.

International career
In 2015, Entzminger was first named to the  Canada women's national softball team and competed with the team in the 2015 Pan American Games. Entzminger returned to the Canadian national team in 2018 to compete in three tournaments, including the 2018 Women's Softball World Championship.

Entzminger competed at the 2019 Pan American Games in Lima, winning silver. 

In June 2021, Entzminger was named to Canada's 2020 Olympic team.

References

External links
 San Jose State Spartans bio

1996 births
Living people
Canadian softball players
Competitors at the 2022 World Games
Sportspeople from Victoria, British Columbia
Softball players at the 2019 Pan American Games
Medalists at the 2019 Pan American Games
Pan American Games silver medalists for Canada
San Jose State Spartans softball players
Canadian expatriate sportspeople in the United States
Softball players at the 2020 Summer Olympics
Olympic softball players of Canada
Medalists at the 2020 Summer Olympics
Olympic bronze medalists for Canada
Olympic medalists in softball
Pan American Games medalists in softball